"Diggin' on You" is a song by American girl group TLC, from the group's second studio album, CrazySexyCool (1994). The song was written and produced by Babyface. It was released by LaFace and Arista Records on October 10, 1995, as the fourth and final single from their album. A pop ballad, the song consists of a guitar, synthesizer and drum machine. The lyrics depict a relationship between a male and female during a summer afternoon.

"Diggin' on You" received generally positive reviews from music critics, many of whom praised the production. The song peaked at number five on the US Billboard Hot 100, number six on the Australian ARIA Singles Chart, and at number 18 on the UK Singles Chart. It was certified gold in the United States, Australia, and New Zealand. An accompanying music video was released in October 1995, and is directed by F. Gary Gray. It features TLC performing at a live concert in Las Vegas. "Diggin' on You" has been covered by several artists, while the music video introduction was sampled on Jay-Z's 2002 song "Hovi Baby".

Background and composition
"Diggin' on You" was written and produced by American musician Babyface. The song was recorded at The Music Grinder Studios in Hollywood, California, from 1993 to September 1994, during production of TLC's second studio album, CrazySexyCool (1994). It was sent to contemporary hit radio in the United States on October 10, 1995, and released as a single in the United Kingdom on October 23, 1995. "Diggin' on You" was the fourth and final single to be released from CrazySexyCool. The cover art was photographed by Arnold Turner.

Musically, "Diggin' on You" is a pop ballad, with a soul-pop influence. The song contains a "jeep beat" with a "streetwise vibe", and incorporates a hook. It consists of a guitar, with Babyface's synthesizer and drum machine arrangement. Lyrically, "Diggin' on You" depicts a boy hooking up with a girl "chillin' with [her] Kool-Aid in a park", with Lynn Ford of Indianapolis News opining that it has "a romantic aura steeped in young love". Writing for the Star Tribune, Chuck Campbell noted that "women [...] luxuriate in falling in love" during the song. Throughout the two verses, Tionne "T-Boz" Watkins sings about encountering a man while relaxing on a summer afternoon with Kool-Aid. Watkins, Rozonda "Chilli" Thomas, Debra Killings, and Bebé provide background vocals.

Several "Diggin' on You" remixes were released, which Larry Flick of Billboard commented that it ranged from a live brass version with jazz-inspired horns, to a pop and house hybrid. Writing for Record Mirror, Ralph Tee described C.J. Mackintosh's mix to be "slick [and] smooth" and sonically similar to Roy Ayers, the Untouchables production to contain a "darker hip hop" atmosphere, and compared the tone of Soulshock's remix to R. Kelly.

Critical reception and commercial performance
Writing for The Guardian, Ross Jones praised Babyface's "sultry" production on "Diggin' on You" and opined that monks would be "comely" intrigued by TLC's "dirty phone-call" vocals. Chuck Arnold of Philadelphia Daily News stated that the song is one of three tracks on CrazySexyCool to be "radio-ready", while Langston Wertz Jr. of The Charlotte Observer and Cheryl Jackson of The Tampa Tribune considered "Diggin' on You" to be "sexy (and memorable)" and "laid-back" respectively.

Tee gave the song's remixes a four out of five rating and considered Mackintosh's mix to be "the best". While reviewing the European 12-inch single of "Diggin' on You", James Hamilton of Record Mirror described Eddie F's remix as "slinky rolling" accompanied by the TLC members' "husk[y]" and "[coo]ing" vocals, Soulshock's production as "delicately weaving", Mackintosh's mix as "chunk[y]" and "jiggling", and the Going Home Dub as "repetitive stuttery cantoring".

In the United States, "Diggin' on You" peaked at number five on the Billboard Hot 100 chart dated December 30, 1995, where it remained for 20 weeks. The song received a gold certification by the Recording Industry Association of America (RIAA) on January 3, 1996, for selling 500,000 copies in the US. In Australia, "Diggin' on You" debuted at number 36 on the ARIA Singles Chart dated January 21, 1996. It peaked at number six on the chart dated March 10, 1996, and was certified gold for sales of 35,000 track-equivalent units in the country. The song peaked at number eight on the New Zealand Singles Chart dated November 26, 1995, and charted for 10 weeks. It received a gold certification by Recorded Music NZ (RMNZ), for sales of 5,000 track-equivalent units in New Zealand. In the United Kingdom, "Diggin' on You" bowed at number 18 on the UK Singles Chart dated November 4, 1995, where it remained for five weeks. On the Irish Singles Chart, the song debuted on the chart dated November 2, 1995. It peaked at number 21 and charted for four weeks.

Music video and legacy
An accompanying music video for "Diggin' on You" aired on MTV in October 1995, after "Kick Your Game" was sent to radio stations and TLC's management needed another song to be promoted as its replacement. It was directed by F. Gary Gray, who returned from directing the video for TLC's previous song "Waterfalls" during the same year. The video begins with the group arriving at a Las Vegas concert via helicopter, which opens with fanfare and uses the song's video version. They perform in front of a loud audience, with the members' appearance described by Billboard writer Brett Atwood as "larger-than-life". The music video was filmed at MGM Grand Las Vegas and Madison Square Garden during TLC's tour, which Gray acknowledged that the venues' restrictions impacted filming and consequently stifled his creativity.

The "Diggin' on You" music video introduction was sampled on Jay-Z's 2002 song "Hovi Baby", which was produced by Just Blaze. American musician Sevyn Streeter performed a cover version of "Diggin' on You" as an a cappella on YouTube, which Da'Shan Smith of Billboard declared as "soft-rock&B". Smith additionally compared "Diggin' on You" to Streeter's 2013 song "It Won't Stop", noting that both contain lyrics regarding "an endless infatuation with a lover". In 2017, Canadian producer Kaytranada released a 2-step club remix of the song on his SoundCloud account, which was considered "irresistible" by Paper writer Sandra Song, and "breezy" by Max Mohenu of Vice. Kelly Clarkson performed a cover of "Diggin' on You" on The Kelly Clarkson Show episode dated March 29, 2021, where she was accompanied by a band and performed atop a purple and yellow-lit set.

Track listings

US CD single

US 12-inch single

US cassette single

US maxi single

UK CD single

European CD single

European 12-inch single

Remixes digital download

Credits and personnel
Credits adapted from the back cover of "Diggin' on You".

 Recorded by Brad Gilderman at The Music Grinder Studios, Hollywood, California
 Assisted by Eric Fischer and Lamont Hyde
 Mixed by Dave Way at Larrabee Sound Studios, Los Angeles, California
 All synthesizers and drum programming by Babyface
 Background vocals by T-Boz, Chilli, Debra Killings, Bebé

Charts

Weekly charts

Year-end charts

Certifications

Release history

References

1990s ballads
1994 songs
1995 singles
Arista Records singles
Contemporary R&B ballads
LaFace Records singles
Music videos directed by F. Gary Gray
Pop ballads
Song recordings produced by Babyface (musician)
Songs written by Babyface (musician)
Soul ballads
TLC (group) songs